Krebs Glacier is a glacier flowing west into the head of Charlotte Bay on the west coast of Graham Land, Antarctica. It was charted by the Belgian Antarctic Expedition under Gerlache, 1897–99, and was named by the UK Antarctic Place-Names Committee in 1960 for Arthur Constantin Krebs, who, with Charles Renard, constructed and flew the first dirigible airship capable of steady flight under control, in 1884.

Further reading 
 US Geological Survey, Coastal-change and Glaciological Map of the Trinity Peninsula Area and South Shetland Islands, P 28

External links 

 Krebs Glacier on USGS website
 Krebs Glacier on SCAR website
 Krebs Glacier on marine regions website

References 

Glaciers of Danco Coast